This is a list of electoral results for the Electoral district of East Kimberley in Western Australian state elections.

Members for East Kimberley

Election results

Elections in the 1900s

 Connor had held the seat unopposed in 1897.

Elections in the 1890s

References

Western Australian state electoral results by district